Workhall is a village in Saint Philip Parish in Barbados.

References

Populated places in Barbados